Breckland Farmland is a 13,392.4 hectare biological Site of Special Scientific Interest (SSSI) in many separate areas between Swaffham in Norfolk and Bury St Edmunds in Suffolk. It is part of the Breckland Special Protection Area under the European Union Directive on the Conservation of Wild Birds.

The site is designated an SSSI for its internationally important population of stone curlews. These birds nest in March on bare ground in cultivated land with very short vegetation. Fields with sugar beet and vegetables and no recreational disturbance are preferred.

The site is almost all farmland with no public access.

References

Sites of Special Scientific Interest in Suffolk
Sites of Special Scientific Interest in Norfolk